Robert Vyner may refer to:

 Sir Robert Vyner, 1st Baronet, (1631–1688), Lord Mayor of London 1674–1675
 Robert Vyner (1686–1777), Member of Parliament (MP) for Great Grimsby  1710–1713, and for Lincolnshire 1724–1761
 Robert Vyner (1717–1799), MP for Okehampton 1754–1761, for Lincoln 1774–1784    
 Robert Vyner (1762–1810), MP for Lincolnshire 1794–1802